The Nicaraguan Football Federation (FENIFUT) is the official governing body of association football in Nicaragua.

FENIFUT comprises 19 departmental and 153 municipal federations. It oversees all national men's, women's, futsal and youth championships. It is additionally responsible for appointing the management of the men's, women's, and various youth national football teams.

Association staff

References

External links
  Official website
 Nicaragua at the FIFA website.
 Nicaragua at CONCACAF site

Nicaragua
Football in Nicaragua
Nic
Football
Sports organizations established in 1931
1931 establishments in Nicaragua